Monodora carolinae is a species of plant in the family Annonaceae.  It is native to Mozambique and Tanzania.  Thomas Couvreur, the botanist who first formally described the species, named it after his wife Carolina.

Description
It is a tree reaching 6 meters in height.  Its branches have lenticels.  Its leathery leaves are 8-10 by 4-6 centimeters and come to a point at their tips.  The leaves are smooth on their upper and lower surfaces when mature.  Its petioles are 4 millimeters long.  Its pendulous flowers are solitary and axillary.  Each flower is on a smooth pedicel 13-35 millimeters long.  Its flowers have 3 rust-colored, triangular sepals that are 6-12 by 4-8 millimeters long with hairy margins.  Its 6 petals are arranged in two rows of 3.  The smooth outer petals are cream-colored with red spots and curve backwards.  The outer petals are 15-25 by 6-12 millimeters, have wavy margins, and come to a point at their tip.  The inner petals have a 3-5 by 2-4 millimeter claw at their base and a 6-15 by 6-14 millimeter blade that is cream-colored with red and yellow highlights.  The blades of the inner petals have densely hairy margins.  Its stamens are 0.8 millimeters long.

Reproductive biology
The pollen of M. carolinae  is shed as permanent tetrads.

Habitat and distribution
It has been observed growing in sandy, well-drained soils in mountainous forests at elevations from 1700 to 2000 meters.

References

Flora of Mozambique
Flora of Tanzania
Plants described in 2006